Wilmslow railway station is in Wilmslow, Cheshire, England,  south of Manchester Piccadilly on the Crewe to Manchester Line.

The station has four platforms with disabled access to each, two waiting rooms, public toilets and also has a double-staffed booking office below the platforms.

History
Both the Main Line and the Styal line were electrified in 1959 as part of the West Coast Main Line electrification and modernisation programme with the construction and installation of a state of the art signal box and control centre near the end of the Styal line down platform at Wilmslow and serving virtually the entire railway from Crewe to Manchester via both routes. The complexity of that installation was not repeated for the remainder of the electrification scheme, which had its control and signalling systems renewed in ways that were less highly automated.

In March 1997, the Provisional IRA exploded two bombs in relay boxes near this signal box, causing disruption to rail and road services. The railway reopened the following day. In April 2006, as part of the total renewal of the railway from Crewe to  near Stockport, the large 1959 signal box was demolished.

Large-scale resignalling of the line through Wilmslow was completed behind schedule in the Autumn of 2006.

Services
One Northern Trains service operates via  (all stations via ), the remainder all run via . Since May 2018, some Northern Trains services run beyond Piccadilly to either Liverpool Lime Street via  or  via .

On Sundays, there are hourly main line services to South Wales and London but the local routes run less frequently i.e. two trains per hour to  - one via  and one via  continuing to  via Chat Moss. The service from  terminates here.

Future high speed services
The economic case for High Speed 2 Phase 1 includes one train per hour each way stopping at Wilmslow, travelling between London Euston and Manchester Piccadilly.

References

Further reading

External links

 Crewe-Manchester Community Rail Partnership

Railway stations in Cheshire
DfT Category C2 stations
Former London and North Western Railway stations
Railway stations in Great Britain opened in 1842
Railway stations served by Avanti West Coast
Northern franchise railway stations
Railway stations served by Transport for Wales Rail
Wilmslow